Yakau Anatolevich Branshteyn (Belarusian: Якаў Анатолевіч Бранштэйн, Yakov Anatolyevich Bronshteyn; November 10, 1897 - October 29, 1937) was a Belarusian literary critic. He was born in Bielsk Podlaski in the Grodno Governorate of the Russian Empire (present-day Poland). During the Great Purge, he was shot as part of the 1937 mass execution of Belarusians. After the death of Joseph Stalin, he was rehabilitated.

References
 Бародзіч Д. Спадчына Я. Бранштэйна // ЛіМ. 1958, 23 ліп.
 Лынькоў М. Ён быў сярод нас… // ЛіМ. 1962, 25 снеж.
 БП, т. 1.
 Возвращенные имена. Мн.: Наука и техника, 1992

External links
 Член-карэспандэнт БРАНШТЭЙН Якаў Анатольевіч
 Инна Бронштейн — За глянцевой обложкой Блаженств 

1897 births
1937 deaths
People from Bielsk Podlaski
People from Belsky Uyezd (Grodno Governorate)
Jews from the Russian Empire
Belarusian Jews
Soviet Jews
Belarusian writers
Soviet military personnel of the Russian Civil War
Great Purge victims from Belarus
Jews executed by the Soviet Union
People executed by the Soviet Union by firearm
Soviet rehabilitations
Soviet people of Polish-Jewish descent
Belarusian people of Polish-Jewish descent